Johan Bensalla is a French-Algerian rugby union player who currently plays for Avenir Valencien and is an Algerian international. He plays as a Scrum-half and Fly-half.

Playing career

Algeria
He got his first international cap for Algeria on 18 December 2015 against  in Oran, Algeria.

International matches

Rugby statistics

References

External links
itsrugby.fr profile

Algerian rugby union players
Living people
French sportspeople of Algerian descent
1991 births
Rugby union fly-halves
Rugby union scrum-halves